The Eye of the Sheep is a 2014 novel by Australian novelist Sofie Laguna which won the 2015 Miles Franklin Award.

Notes
 Dedication: For TL, in memory.

Reviews
 The Australian
 Readings

Awards and nominations
 2015 winner Miles Franklin Award
 2015 shortlisted Stella Prize
 2015 commended The Fellowship of Australian Writers Victoria Inc. National Literary Awards — FAW Christina Stead Award

References 

2014 Australian novels
Miles Franklin Award-winning works
Allen & Unwin books